Pekkanen is a Finnish surname. Notable people with the surname include:

 John Pekkanen (born 1939), American author and journalist
 Toivo Pekkanen (1902–1957), Finnish writer

See also
 Pakkanen

Finnish-language surnames